The Country Blues is a seminal book by Samuel Charters, published in 1959 and generally acknowledged as the first scholarly book-length study of country blues music. An album of the same name was issued on Folkways Records as an accompaniment to provide examples of the artists and styles discussed. It was reprinted by Da Capo Press in 1975 with minor edits, and a new introduction by the author.

References 

1959 non-fiction books
History books about the United States
Ethnomusicology
Music books
Music textbooks